Rohit Vishwakarma (born 1 November 1993) is an Indian cricketer who plays for Railways. He made his first-class debut on 15 November 2015 in the 2015–16 Ranji Trophy, playing for Railways. On 12 January 2021, in the 2020–21 Syed Mushtaq Ali Trophy, he scored his first century in a T20 match.

References

External links
 

1993 births
Living people
Indian cricketers
Bengal cricketers
Railways cricketers
Cricketers from Kolkata